The Lost Cause of the Confederacy is a set of false beliefs about the American Civil War.

Lost Cause may also refer to:

Lost Cause (Jandek album), 1992
Lost Cause (Tory Lanez mixtape), 2014
"Lost Cause" (Beck song), 2002
"Lost Cause" (Billie Eilish song), 2021
"Lost Cause", a 1983 song by Riot Squad
"Lost Cause", a 1989 song by Cosmic Psychos
"Lost Cause", a song by Priscilla Ahn from the album When You Grow Up (2011)
Lost Cause Motors, an American automobile manufacturer from 1963 to 1964